Flávio Basilua Jacinto Nazinho (born 20 July 2003) is a Portuguese professional footballer who plays as a left-back for Primeira Liga club Sporting CP.

Club career
Born in Almada, Setúbal District, and of Bissau-Guinean descent, Nazinho began his youth career at Sporting CP's youth system. He would be forced to leave their academy, due to his father being unable to take him to training.  Due to the fatigue shown by him, his father preferred to put his son to play in clubs in the region where they lived, leading him to be integrated into Monte Caparica, Leão Altivo, Cova da Piedade and Pescadores's youth academies. At the age of 14, Nazinho sparked the interest of several scouts, caughting attention of Braga, whom he signed a contract with, before returning to Sporting CP's academy in 2018, after impressing in a exhibition match against them.

Nazinho joined their B-team in 2020 and signed a professional contract with the club on 1 March 2021. During this time, he initially played as an left-winger, before being converted to a left-back. After impressing in his new position, he was called up to the first team by manager Rúben Amorim, and occasionally played in the club's under 23s and B teams.

He made his professional debut for Sporting in a 3–1 UEFA Champions League group stage victory against Borussia Dortmund on 24 November 2021, replacing Pedro Gonçalves in the 88th minute, in a match, where his team ensured qualification to the round of sixteen for the first time since the 2008–09 season. He would make his league debut for the club, as a starter on 11 December in a 2–0 home win over Boavista.

International career
Nazinho represented Portugal at under-16, under-18, under-19 levels, for a total of 6 caps.

Career statistics

Club

References

External links
Sporting official profile 
Flávio Nazinho at MaisFutebol 

2003 births
Living people
Sportspeople from Almada
Portuguese footballers
Portugal youth international footballers
Portuguese sportspeople of Bissau-Guinean descent
Association football fullbacks
Sporting CP footballers
Sporting CP B players
Primeira Liga players
Campeonato de Portugal (league) players
Black Portuguese sportspeople